Meer Ali is an Indian television actor and a fashion model. He was  seen playing lead in &TV's show Main Bhi Ardhangini and is  currently portraying Devraj Indra in Sony TV show Vighnaharta Ganesha for which he was nominated in the category (Best actor in a Negative role ). He also  played lead in shows like super cop vs super villain "shapath", Miley Jab Hum Tum, Dahleez (2016 TV series), and was also seen in several shows such as Shubh Arambh (colours), Alif Laila 2 (Dangal), kahath Hanuman &TV, and in some mega stories of  P.I Private Investigator, Savdhaan India, Aahat (season 6) and CID.

Awards
Meer Ali was nominated in the category Best Actor in a Negative Role in Zee TV's Gold Awards 2019 September 2019.

Meer Ali was nominated in the category Best Actor in Supporting Role for Star Plus's TV show Navya in New Talent Award 2012.

Television

References

External links

Living people
Indian male models
Indian male television actors
Male actors in Hindi television
Male actors from Mumbai
Year of birth missing (living people)